Annals of the Western Shore is a young adult fantasy series by Ursula K. Le Guin. It consists of three books: Gifts (2004), Voices (2006), and Powers (2007). Each book has different main characters and settings, but the books are linked by some recurring characters and locations. Gifts won the PEN Center USA 2005 Children's literature award. Powers won the 2008 Nebula Award for Best Novel.

Plot

The books in the trilogy share the same imaginary world; their plots are set among small city states and independent polities, in a fertile region on the western shore of a continental land mass, in an otherwise unspecified world. The culture is at a generally medieval level, with traditional crafts but no advanced technology. The three books share some characters; the protagonists in Gifts reappear as supporting or minor characters in the later books.

Gifts centers on two young people, Gry and Orrec, who struggle to come to terms with inherent psychic abilities. They live in a poor, mountainous, and culturally backward region, famous for its "witches" and wonder-workers. Gry is a girl who can communicate with animals; she refuses to use her gift to aid hunters, which sets her apart from many in her culture, including her own mother. Orrec is a boy whose supposed gift of "unmaking" is apparently so dangerous that he voluntarily goes through life blindfolded, to avoid causing destruction. The story reveals how Orrec and Gry cope with their gifts, and eventually leave their mountainous home for the wider world.

 Voices tells the story of Memer, a girl who lives in an occupied country. Her home, Ansul, has been conquered by the Alds, a desert people from the east, who are now its brutal and superstitious occupiers. Memer secretly learns of a world of suppressed books and writings, and falls in love with her people's ancient literature; she meets Gry and Orrec, who come to Ansul as travelling storytellers. Together, their entwined fates play out against the outcome of the political struggle of Ansul and the Alds.

In Powers, Gavir is a slave who develops a gift for precognition. He is trained to serve as a teacher for a noble family in the city of Etra; but personal tragedy drives him into the life of a hunted wanderer. He endures adventures, challenges, and suffering. Eventually he escapes to a new and happy life that he shares with Memer, Gry, and Orrec.

Religions 
The main religion of the Western Shore follows three main deities: Ennu (Ennu-Amba to the Marsh People), who is portrayed as a Lion and is said to guide souls into the after life; Luck, who rides across the sky in a chariot pulling the sun (like the Greek god Apollo); and Sampa the Destroyer. People in the city states pray to their ancestors.

The second main religion is the one followed by the Desert Alds, who believe that there is only one true god, Atth the god of fire, and that those who survive burns are holy. Their religion led them to invade Ansul because they thought that the Anti-Atth resided around that area; they believed themselves right when they found the great Library of Ansul, because they believe that demons hide within script. They threw all the books and their owners into the harbour because they burn only holy things.

References

External links

 
  Reviews, excerpts and other info.